Danny Howe (born December 31, 1970 in Kingston, Ontario) is a Canadian sprint canoer who competed in the mid-1990s. At the 1996 Summer Olympics, he finished ninth in the C-2 1000 m event.

References
Sports-Reference.com profile

1970 births
Canadian male canoeists
Canoeists at the 1996 Summer Olympics
Living people
Olympic canoeists of Canada
Sportspeople from Kingston, Ontario
Pan American Games medalists in canoeing
Pan American Games bronze medalists for Canada
Canoeists at the 1995 Pan American Games
Medalists at the 1995 Pan American Games
20th-century Canadian people
21st-century Canadian people